This is a list of 647 species in Chironomus, a genus of midges in the family Chironomidae.

Chironomus species

 Chironomus aberratus Keyl, 1961 c g
 Chironomus abjectus Kieffer, 1917 c g
 Chironomus acerbiphilus Tokunaga, 1939 c g
 Chironomus acerbus Hirvenoja, 1962 c g
 Chironomus acidophilus Keyl, 1960 c g
 Chironomus acuminatus Freeman, 1957 c g
 Chironomus acutiventris Wulker & Ryser, 1983 c g
 Chironomus aegyptius (Kieffer, 1913) c g
 Chironomus affinis Wiedemann, 1817 c g
 Chironomus agilis Schobanov & Djomin, 1988 c g
 Chironomus albicinctus (Gimmerthal, 1845) c g
 Chironomus albidus Konstantinov, 1956 c g
 Chironomus albiforceps (Kieffer, 1910) c g
 Chironomus albimaculatus Shobanov, Wulker & Kiknadze, 2002 c g
 Chironomus albipes (Miegen, 1830) c g
 Chironomus albiscapula (Kieffer, 1918) c g
 Chironomus albocinctus (Strobl, 1880) c g
 Chironomus allothrix (Kieffer, 1912) c g
 Chironomus alluaudi Kieffer, 1913 c g
 Chironomus alpestris Goetghebuer, 1934 g
 Chironomus alternans Walker, 1856 c g
 Chironomus ambiguus (Wulp, 1859) c g
 Chironomus analis Freeman, 1959 c g
 Chironomus anamalipes (Kieffer, 1913) c g
 Chironomus anchialicus Michailova, 1974 c g
 Chironomus androgyne Kieffer, 1918 c g
 Chironomus angorensis (Kieffer, 1918) c g
 Chironomus angustatus Thienemann & Kieffer, 1916 c g
 Chironomus annandalei (Kieffer, 1910) c
 Chironomus annularius Kieffer, 1926 c g
 Chironomus annulatus (Macquart, 1826) c g
 Chironomus anomalus (Kieffer, 1921) c g
 Chironomus anonymus Williston, 1896
 Chironomus antarcticus Walker, 1837 c g
 Chironomus antennalis Kieffer, 1917 c g
 Chironomus anthracinus Zetterstedt, 1860 i c g
 Chironomus antipodensis Sublette & Wirth, 1980 c g
 Chironomus antonioi Correia & Trivinho-Strixino, 2007 c g
 Chironomus apicatus Johannsen, 1932 c g
 Chironomus aplochirus (Kieffer, 1911) c g
 Chironomus aploneurus (Kieffer, 1911) c g
 Chironomus aprilinus Meigen, 1830 c g
 Chironomus aquaeducti (Matsumura, 1917) c g
 Chironomus arcuatus Kieffer, 1917 c g
 Chironomus arcustylus Siirin, 2003 c g
 Chironomus armatifrons (Kieffer, 1913) c g
 Chironomus articuliferus (Blanchard, 1852) c g
 Chironomus astenus (Kieffer, 1916) c g
 Chironomus athalassicus Cannings, 1975 i c g
 Chironomus atrella (Townes, 1945) i c g b
 Chironomus atrifurea (Kieffer, 1911) c g
 Chironomus atripennis Rempel, 1939 c g
 Chironomus atripes (Kieffer, 1910) c g
 Chironomus atritibia Malloch, 1934 i c g
 Chironomus atrosignatus (Kieffer, 1911) c g
 Chironomus atroviridis (Townes, 1945) i c g b
 Chironomus attenuatus Walker, 1848 i c g
 Chironomus aurantiacus (Kieffer, 1921) c g
 Chironomus australiensis (Freeman, 1961) c g
 Chironomus australis Macquart, 1847 c g
 Chironomus balatonicus Devai, Wulker & Scholl, 1983 c g
 Chironomus balticus (Kieffer, 1925) c
 Chironomus baraderensis (Lynch Arribalzaga, 1893) c g
 Chironomus barbatitarsis (Kieffer, 1911) c
 Chironomus bavaricus Wulker & Ryser, 1983 c g
 Chironomus behningi Goetghebuer, 1928 c g
 Chironomus beljaninae Wulker, 1991 c g
 Chironomus bernensis Klotzi & Klotzi, 1973 c g
 Chironomus bethsaidae (Kieffer, 1915) c g
 Chironomus bharati Singh & Kulshrestha, 1976 c g
 Chironomus bicolor (Meigen, 1838) c g
 Chironomus bicoloris Tokunaga, 1964 c g
 Chironomus bicornutus (Kieffer, 1913) c
 Chironomus bifurcatus Wulker, Martin, Kiknadze, Sublette & Michiels g
 Chironomus bihamatus (Kieffer, 1922) c g
 Chironomus bimaculus Walker, 1848 i c g
 Chironomus bincus Kieffer, 1924 c g
 Chironomus binodulus Kieffer, 1922 c g
 Chironomus bipunctatus (Kieffer, 1910) c g
 Chironomus bipunctus Johannsen, 1932 c g
 Chironomus biseta (Townes, 1945) i c g
 Chironomus biwaprimus Sasa & Kawai, 1987 c g
 Chironomus blandellus (Kieffer, 1906) c g
 Chironomus blaylocki  g
 Chironomus boliviensis Kieffer, 1917 c g
 Chironomus bonus Shilova, 1974 c g
 Chironomus borealis Curtis, 1835 i c
 Chironomus borokensis Kerkis, Filippova & Shobanov, 1988 c g
 Chironomus boydi  i g
 Chironomus breviantennatus Konstantinov, 1956 c g
 Chironomus brevicornis (Kieffer, 1918) c g
 Chironomus brevidentatus Hirvenoja & Michailova, 1998 c g
 Chironomus breviforceps (Kieffer, 1911) c g
 Chironomus brevimanus (Lundstrom, 1915) c g
 Chironomus brevinervis (Holmgren, 1869) c g
 Chironomus brevipalpis (Kieffer, 1926) i c g
 Chironomus brevisetis Shilova, 1989 c g
 Chironomus brevistylus Guha, Das & Chaudhuri, 1985 c g
 Chironomus browni (Kieffer, 1911) c g
 Chironomus brunetttii (Kieffer, 1913) c g
 Chironomus brunneipennis Johannsen, 1905 i c g
 Chironomus brunneus Freeman, 1954 c g
 Chironomus bulbosus (Gerry, 1933) c g
 Chironomus caffrarius Kieffer, 1914 c g
 Chironomus calipterus Kieffer, 1908 c g
 Chironomus callichirus Kieffer, 1911 c g
 Chironomus callicomus (Kieffer, 1911) c
 Chironomus calligaster (Kieffer, 1911) c g
 Chironomus calligraphus Goeldi, 1905 c g
 Chironomus callinotus (Kieffer, 1911) c g
 Chironomus callisphyrus (Kieffer, 1911) c g
 Chironomus callithorax (Kieffer, 1911) c g
 Chironomus camptogaster (Kieffer, 1910) c g
 Chironomus canus (Strobl, 1910) - moved to Goeldichironomus. c g
 Chironomus carbo (Philippi, 1865) c g
 Chironomus carolinensis Tokunaga, 1964 c g
 Chironomus carus (Townes, 1945) i
 Chironomus cavazzi Kieffer, 1913 c g
 Chironomus ceylanicus (Kieffer, 1911) c
 Chironomus chelonia (Townes, 1945) i c g
 Chironomus chiron (Haliday, 1856) c g
 Chironomus chlogaster (Kieffer, 1912) c g
 Chironomus chlorogaster Kieffer, 1911 c g
 Chironomus chlorophilus Weyenbergh, 1886 c g
 Chironomus chlorophorus (Kieffer, 1912) c g
 Chironomus chlorostolus (Kieffer, 1912) c g
 Chironomus choricus (Kieffer, 1911) c g
 Chironomus cingulatus Meigen, 1830 c g
 Chironomus circumdatus (Kieffer, 1916) c g
 Chironomus citrinellus (Kieffer, 1913) c g
 Chironomus claggi Tokunaga, 1964 c g
 Chironomus clarinervis (Kieffer, 1924) c g
 Chironomus clarus Hirvenoja, 1962 c g
 Chironomus clavatipes (Kieffer, 1910) c g
 Chironomus cloacalis Atchley & Martin, 1971 c g
 Chironomus coaetaneus Hirvenoja, 1998 g
 Chironomus columbiensis Wulker, Sublette, Morath & Martini, 1989 c g
 Chironomus commutatus Keyl, 1960 c g
 Chironomus compterus (Walker, 1856) c g
 Chironomus confinis (Staeger, 1839) c g
 Chironomus confusus (Lynch Arribalzaga, 1893) c g
 Chironomus congolensis Goetghebuer, 1936 c g
 Chironomus coniger (Kieffer, 1913) c g
 Chironomus conjungens (Kieffer, 1914) c
 Chironomus coracellus Kieffer, 1922 c g
 Chironomus corax (Kieffer, 1911) c g
 Chironomus cordovensis Weyenbergh, 1886 c g
 Chironomus corniger Goethebuer, 1921 c g
 Chironomus costatus Johannsen, 1932 c g
 Chironomus crassicaudatus Malloch, 1915 i c g b
 Chironomus crassicaudus Tokunaga, 1964 c g
 Chironomus crassicornis (Kieffer, 1922) c g
 Chironomus crassiforceps (Kieffer, 1916) c g
 Chironomus crassimanus Strenzke, 1959 c g
 Chironomus cristatus Fabricius, 1805 - synonym of Chironomus plumosus
 Chironomus crucifer (Kieffer, 1922) c g
 Chironomus cubiculorum (Doleschall, 1856) c g
 Chironomus cucini Webb, 1969 i c g
 Chironomus curabilis Beljanina, Sigareva & Loginova, 1990 c g
 Chironomus curtimanus (Kieffer, 1910) c
 Chironomus curtipalpis Kieffer, 1917 c g
 Chironomus curtitarsis (Kieffer, 1913) c g
 Chironomus dahlbomi Zetterstedt, 1860 c g
 Chironomus daitoabeus Sasa & Suzuki, 2001 c g
 Chironomus daitobeceus Sasa & Suzuki, 2001 c g
 Chironomus daitocedeus Sasa & Suzuki, 2001 c g
 Chironomus daitodeeus Sasa & Suzuki, 2001 c g
 Chironomus daitoefeus Sasa & Suzuki, 2001 c g
 Chironomus decorus Johannsen, 1905 i c g
 Chironomus decumbens Malloch, 1934 i c g
 Chironomus delicatulus (Philippi, 1865) c g
 Chironomus dendrophila (Zvereva, 1950) c g
 Chironomus denigrator (Meigen, 1838) c g
 Chironomus despectus Kieffer, 1917 c g
 Chironomus detriticola Correia & Trivinho-Strixino, 2007 c g
 Chironomus diakonoffi (Kruseman, 1949) c g
 Chironomus dilutus Shobanov, Kiknadze & Butler, 1999 c g b
 Chironomus dimidiatus (Meigen, 1838) c g
 Chironomus disclusus (Walker, 1856) c g
 Chironomus dissimilis (Kieffer, 1917) c
 Chironomus distans Kieffer, 1909 c g
 Chironomus dolichogaster (Kieffer, 1911) c g
 Chironomus dolichomerus (Kieffer, 1911) c g
 Chironomus dolichopelma (Kieffer, 1917) c g
 Chironomus dolichotomus Kieffer, 1911 c g
 Chironomus dorsalis Andersen, 1949 g
 Chironomus dubius (Zetterstedt, 1838) c g
 Chironomus duplex Walker, 1856 c g
 Chironomus dystenus (Kieffer, 1916) c g
 Chironomus eburneocinctus (Philippi, 1865) c g
 Chironomus edwardsi Kruseman - moved to Cladopelma i
 Chironomus elatior Kieffer, 1916 c g
 Chironomus elatus (Kieffer, 1912) c g
 Chironomus enshiensis Wang, 1994 c g
 Chironomus enteromorphae Tokunaga, 1936 c g
 Chironomus entis Schobanov, 1989 c g
 Chironomus equisitus  i g
 Chironomus erimanus (Kieffer, 1917) c g
 Chironomus erythropterus (Kieffer, 1913) c g
 Chironomus esai Wulker, 1997 c g
 Chironomus esakii Tokunaga i
 Chironomus excavatus Kieffer, 1917 - probably Cryptochironomus i c g
 Chironomus excisus Kieffer, 1917 i c g
 Chironomus fasciatus (Meigen, 1804) c g
 Chironomus ferrugineus (Macquart, 1838) c g
 Chironomus filimanus Kieffer, 1918 c g
 Chironomus filitarsis (Kieffer, 1911) c
 Chironomus fimbriatus (Kieffer, 1910) c
 Chironomus fittkaui Correia & Trivinho-Strixino, 2007 c g
 Chironomus flabellatus (Meigen, 1818) c g
 Chironomus flaveolus Meigen, 1818 c g
 Chironomus flavicans (Macquart, 1850) c g
 Chironomus flavicollis Meigen, 1818 c g
 Chironomus flavitibia Johannsen, 1932 c g
 Chironomus flaviventris (Kieffer, 1911) c g
 Chironomus flavofasciatus Kieffer, 1918 c g
 Chironomus flavoridis (Lundstrom, 1915) c g
 Chironomus flavoviridis Lundstrom, 1915 g
 Chironomus fluminicola Weyenbergh, 1886 c g
 Chironomus forficularis (Kieffer, 1911) c g
 Chironomus formosae (Kieffer, 1912) c g
 Chironomus formosicola (Kieffer, 1912) c g
 Chironomus formosipennis Kieffer, 1908 c g
 Chironomus forsythi Martin, 1999 c g
 Chironomus fortistylus Chaudhuri, Das & Sublette, 1992 c g
 Chironomus fraterculus (Zetterstedt, 1850) c g
 Chironomus fraternus Wulker, 1991 c g
 Chironomus frequentatus Belyanina & Filinkova, 1996 c g
 Chironomus frisianus (Kieffer, 1912) c g
 Chironomus frommeri Atchley and Martin, 1971 i c g
 Chironomus fujiquartus Sasa, 1985 c g
 Chironomus fujisecundus Sasa, 1985 c g
 Chironomus fujitertius Sasa, 1985 c g
 Chironomus fulvescens (Kieffer, 1911) c g
 Chironomus fulviventris (Kieffer, 1921) c g
 Chironomus fundatus Philinkova & Belyanina, 1993 c g
 Chironomus fusciceps Yamamoto, 1990 c g
 Chironomus fuscitarsis (Kieffer, 1911) c
 Chironomus fusiformis (Kieffer, 1913) c
 Chironomus galilaeus (Kieffer, 1915) c g
 Chironomus gigas Reiss, 1974 c g
 Chironomus ginzanabeus Sasa & Suzuki, 2001 c g
 Chironomus ginzanbeceus Sasa & Suzuki, 2001 c g
 Chironomus glabrimanus (Kieffer, 1913) c g
 Chironomus glabripes (Kieffer, 1913) c g
 Chironomus glauciventris (Kieffer, 1912) c g
 Chironomus glaucogaster (Kieffer, 1912) c g
 Chironomus globulus Filinkova & Belyanina, 1993 c g
 Chironomus gloriosus (Kieffer, 1912) c g
 Chironomus graciliforceps (Kieffer, 1910) c g
 Chironomus gracilimus (Zetterstedt, 1855) c g
 Chironomus gracilipes (Kieffer, 1916) c g
 Chironomus gracilis (Macquart, 1826) c g
 Chironomus grandilobus (Kieffer, 1916) c g
 Chironomus grandivalva (Shilova, 1957) c g
 Chironomus grisescens Goethgebuer, 1921 c g
 Chironomus grossipes (Kieffer, 1911) c g
 Chironomus gualtemaltecus Cockerell, 1915 c g
 Chironomus halli (Kieffer, 1910) c g
 Chironomus halophilus Packard, 1873 - Synonym Chironomus decorus i c g
 Chironomus halteratus (Zetterstedt, 1855) c g
 Chironomus harpi Sublette, 1991 c g
 Chironomus harti Malloch, 1915 - moved to Apedilum i c g
 Chironomus hawaiiensis Grimshaw i c g
 Chironomus heptatomus (Kieffer, 1912) c g
 Chironomus heteracerus (Kieffer, 1913) c g
 Chironomus heterodentatus Konstantinov, 1956 c g
 Chironomus heteropilicornis Wulker, 1996 c g
 Chironomus hexatomus (Kieffer, 1912) c g
 Chironomus himalayanus (Kieffer, 1911) c g
 Chironomus hircus (Weyenbergh, 1886) c g
 Chironomus hirtimanus Kieffer & Thienemann, 1908 c g
 Chironomus hirtitarsis Johannsen, 1932 c g
 Chironomus hirtulus (Zetterstedt, 1838) c g
 Chironomus holochlorus (Philippi, 1865) c g
 Chironomus holomelas Keyl, 1961 c g
 Chironomus humeralis (Macquart, 1826) c g
 Chironomus humilis (Kieffer, 1917) c
 Chironomus hungaricus (Szito, 1969) c g
 Chironomus huonensis (Kieffer, 1917) c g
 Chironomus hyperboreus Staeger, 1845 i c g
 Chironomus ignotus Zavrel, 1932 c g
 Chironomus imberbis Kieffer, 1917 c g
 Chironomus imicola Kieffer, 1913 c g
 Chironomus immundus (Zetterstedt, 1838) c g
 Chironomus improvidus Hirvenoja, 1998 g
 Chironomus improvisus Shobanov, 2004 c g
 Chironomus incertipenis Chaudhuri, 1996 c g
 Chironomus incertus (Kieffer, 1924) c g
 Chironomus inermifrons (Kieffer, 1916) c g
 Chironomus innocens (Weyenbergh, 1886) c g
 Chironomus inquinatus Correia, Trivinho-Strixino & Michailova, 2006 c g
 Chironomus insignis (Wiedemann, 1828) c g
 Chironomus instabilis (Walker, 1865) c g
 Chironomus intersectus (Meigen, 1838) c g
 Chironomus islandicus (Kieffer, 1913) c g
 Chironomus jacundus Walker i g
 Chironomus jamaicensis Gerry, 1933 c g
 Chironomus januarius Skuse, 1889 c g
 Chironomus javanus Kieffer, 1924 c g
 Chironomus jommartini Lindeberg & Wiederholm, 1979 c g
 Chironomus joni Spies & Reiss, 1996 c g
 Chironomus jonmartini Lindeberg, 1979 c g
 Chironomus karafutonis (Matsumura, 1911) c g
 Chironomus kiiensis Tokunaga, 1936 c g
 Chironomus kiknadzeae Michailova, 1984 c g
 Chironomus koenigi (Kieffer, 1911) c g
 Chironomus komensis (Zvereva, 1950) c g
 Chironomus lacunarius Wulker & Klotzi, 1973 c g
 Chironomus lacustris (Kieffer, 1913) c g
 Chironomus laetus Belyanina & Filinkova, 1996 c g
 Chironomus laminatus (Kieffer, 1918) c g
 Chironomus lamprathorax (Kieffer, 1911) c g
 Chironomus lampronotus (Kieffer, 1911) c
 Chironomus lasiochirus (Kieffer, 1911) c g
 Chironomus latistylus Reiss, 1974 c g
 Chironomus latus (Staeger, 1839) c g
 Chironomus lenzi Kieffer, 1922 c g
 Chironomus leopardinus (Santos Abreu, 1918) c g
 Chironomus lepidellus (Kieffer, 1906) c g
 Chironomus leptochrius (Kieffer, 1911) c g
 Chironomus leucochlorus Kieffer, 1923 c g
 Chironomus leucopterus Linevich, 1971 c g
 Chironomus leucotarsus (Kieffer, 1911) c g
 Chironomus leucura (Kieffer, 1915) c g
 Chironomus lindygii (Schiner, 1868) c g
 Chironomus linearis Kieffer, 1911 c g
 Chironomus littorellus (Meigen, 1818) c g
 Chironomus livonensis (Gimmerthal, 1845) c g
 Chironomus lobaticeps (Kieffer, 1911) c g
 Chironomus lobaticollis (Kieffer, 1911) c g
 Chironomus longicrus (Kieffer, 1911) c g
 Chironomus longiforceps Kieffer, 1918 c g
 Chironomus longilobus (Kieffer, 1916) c g
 Chironomus longimanus (Meigen, 1830) c g
 Chironomus longistylus Goetghebuer, 1921 c g
 Chironomus longitarsis (Macquart, 1850) c g
 Chironomus longivalvis Kieffer, 1910 c g
 Chironomus loricatus Kieffer, 1917 c g
 Chironomus lucernarum (Kieffer, 1911) c g
 Chironomus lugens (Kieffer, 1906) c g
 Chironomus lugubris Zetterstedt, 1850 c g
 Chironomus lundstroemi Saether, 2004 c g
 Chironomus luridus Strenzke, 1959 c g
 Chironomus macani Freeman, 1948 c g
 Chironomus macquarti (Kieffer, 1906) c g
 Chironomus macrogaster Kieffer, 1911 c g
 Chironomus macroscelus (Kieffer, 1911) c g
 Chironomus macularis (Weyenbergh, 1886) c g
 Chironomus maculatus (Macquart, 1826) c g
 Chironomus maculosus (Macquart, 1834) c g
 Chironomus maddeni Martin & Cranston, 1995 c g
 Chironomus magnivalva Kieffer, 1917 c g
 Chironomus magnus White and Ramsey 2015 as new name for Chironomus major Wuelker and Bulter, 1983
 Chironomus major Wulker and Bulter, 1983 i c g
 Chironomus markosjani Shilova, 1983 c g
 Chironomus maturus Johannsen, 1908 i c g
 Chironomus meinerii Kieffer, 1915 c g
 Chironomus melanderi Kieffer, 1917 i c g
 Chironomus melanescens Keyl, 1961 c g b
 Chironomus melanochirus (Kieffer, 1911) c g
 Chironomus melanocholicus (Zetterstedt, 1855) c g
 Chironomus melanophorus (Kieffer, 1911) c g
 Chironomus melanopus Kieffer, 1916 c g
 Chironomus melanostictus (Kieffer, 1911) c g
 Chironomus melanotus Keyl, 1961 c g
 Chironomus microtomus (Kieffer, 1917) c
 Chironomus mimulus (Holmgren, 1869) c g
 Chironomus minutissimus (Meigen, 1838) c g
 Chironomus minutus (Zetterstedt, 1850) c g
 Chironomus mongolabeus Sasa & Suzuki, 1997 c g
 Chironomus mongolbeceus Sasa & Suzuki, 1997 c g
 Chironomus mongolcedeus Sasa & Suzuki, 1997 c g
 Chironomus mongoldeeus Sasa & Suzuki, 1997 c g
 Chironomus mongolefeus Sasa & Suzuki, 1997 c g
 Chironomus mongolfegeus Sasa & Suzuki, 1997 c g
 Chironomus mongolgeheus Sasa & Suzuki, 1997 c g
 Chironomus mongolheius Sasa & Suzuki, 1997 c g
 Chironomus montuosus Ryser, Wulker & Scholl, 1985 c g
 Chironomus morulus (Walker, 1856) c g
 Chironomus mozleyi Wulker, 2007 c g
 Chironomus multiannulatus (Strobl, 1909) c g
 Chironomus muratensis Ryser, Scholl, 1983 c g
 Chironomus nadayanus (Kieffer, 1918) c g
 Chironomus neglectus (Kieffer, 1917) c g
 Chironomus neocorax Wulker, 1983 c g
 Chironomus neofulvus Rempel, 1939 c g
 Chironomus nepalensis (Kieffer, 1911) c g
 Chironomus nepeanensis Skuse, 1889 c g
 Chironomus niger (Hansen, 1881) c g
 Chironomus nigerarticulus (Tokunaga, 1940) c g
 Chironomus nigerilateralis Tokunaga, 1964 c g
 Chironomus nigricans Goetghebuer, 1927 c g
 Chironomus nigriforceps (Kieffer, 1911) c g
 Chironomus nigrifrons Linevich, 1971 c g
 Chironomus nigrinus (Macquart, 1834) c g
 Chironomus nigripes (Gimmerthal, 1846) c g
 Chironomus nigritibia Walker, 1848 i c g
 Chironomus nigritus (Kieffer, 1906) c g
 Chironomus nigriventris (Wulp, 1858) c g
 Chironomus nigrocaudata Erbaeva, 1968 c g
 Chironomus nigrocinctus (Becker, 1903) c g
 Chironomus nigromarginatus (Kieffer, 1911) c g
 Chironomus nigrosparsus (Kieffer, 1911) c g
 Chironomus nigroviridis Macquart, 1834 g
 Chironomus nippodorsalis Sasa, 1979 c g
 Chironomus nipponensis Tokunaga, 1940 c g
 Chironomus nitidicollis (Holmgren, 1883) c g
 Chironomus nitidiventris Edwards, 1931 c g
 Chironomus nitidus (Kieffer, 1913) c g
 Chironomus niveipes (Zetterstedt, 1850) c g
 Chironomus noctuabundus Kieffer, 1911 c g
 Chironomus nocturnalis Kieffer, 1911 c g
 Chironomus nocturnus (Lynch Arribalzaga, 1893) c g
 Chironomus novosibiricus Kiknadze, Siirin & Kerkis, 1993 c g
 Chironomus nudipes (Kieffer, 1911) c
 Chironomus nuditarsis Keyl, 1961 c g
 Chironomus nudiventris Ryser, Scholl, 1983 c g
 Chironomus nympha (Kieffer, 1911) c
 Chironomus obensis Filinkova & Belyanina, 1996 c g
 Chironomus obscurellus (Blanchard, 1852) c g
 Chironomus obscuripennis (Holmgren, 1869) c g
 Chironomus obscuripes Holmgren, 1869 c g
 Chironomus obscurus Filinkova & Belyanina, 1994 c g
 Chironomus obtusidens Goetghebuer, 1921 c g
 Chironomus occidentalis Skuse, 1889 c g
 Chironomus ochraceus (Wulp, 1858) c g
 Chironomus ochreatus (Townes, 1945) i c g b
 Chironomus ochrocoma Kieffer, 1922 c g
 Chironomus oculatus Shobanov, 1996 c g
 Chironomus okinawanus Hasegawa & Sasa, 1987 c g
 Chironomus oliveirai Correia & Trivinho-Strixino, 2007 c g
 Chironomus oppositus Walker, 1856 c g
 Chironomus oriplanus (Kieffer, 1911) c
 Chironomus ornatissimus (Kieffer, 1913) c g
 Chironomus palidus Linevich, 1971 c g
 Chironomus pallidiceps (Kieffer, 1917) c g
 Chironomus pallidiforceps (Kieffer, 1917) c g
 Chironomus pallidivittatus Malloch, 1915 i c g
 Chironomus pallipes (Macquart, 1826) c g
 Chironomus palpalis Johannsen, 1932 c g
 Chironomus pankratovi Grebenjuk, Kiknadze & Beljanina, 1989 c g
 Chironomus paraalbidus Polukonova, Belyanina & Zinchenko, 2005 c g
 Chironomus paragigas Reiss, 1974 c g
 Chironomus parathummi Keyl, 1961 c g
 Chironomus pauciplumatus Hardy, 1960 i c g
 Chironomus paulfreemani Sawedal, 1981 c g
 Chironomus pectoralis Kieffer, 1917 c g
 Chironomus pedestris (Meigen, 1830) c g
 Chironomus perangustatus Goetghebuer, 1952 c g
 Chironomus percurrens Kieffer, 1909 c g
 Chironomus perichlorus (Kieffer, 1912) c g
 Chironomus perileucus (Kieffer, 1914) c g
 Chironomus peringueyi Kieffer, 1923 c g
 Chironomus pervagatus Skuse, 1889 c g
 Chironomus petiolatus Kieffer, 1917 c g
 Chironomus phytophilus Correia & Trivinho-Strixino, 2007 c g
 Chironomus pica (Philippi, 1865) c g
 Chironomus pictiventris (Kieffer, 1910) c g
 Chironomus piger Strenzke, 1959 c g
 Chironomus pilicornis (Fabricius, 1794) i c
 Chironomus planicollis (Kieffer, 1911) c g
 Chironomus plasenis (Strobl, 1900) c g
 Chironomus platensis (Lynch Arribalzaga, 1893) c g
 Chironomus ploenesis (Kieffer, 1922) c g
 Chironomus plumatisetigerus Tokunaga, 1964 c g
 Chironomus plumosulus Golubeva, 1987 c g
 Chironomus plumosus (Linnaeus, 1758) i c g b  (buzzer midge)
 Chironomus polaris Kirby, 1824 c g
 Chironomus polonicus Michailova, Kownacki & Langton, 2013 g
 Chironomus polystictus (Kieffer, 1911) c g
 Chironomus praeapicalis Tokunaga, 1964 c g
 Chironomus praecox (Meigen, 1818) c g
 Chironomus prasinellus (Kieffer, 1912) c g
 Chironomus prasinus Meigen, 1804 c g
 Chironomus prasiogaster (Kieffer, 1911) c
 Chironomus pretiosus (Kieffer, 1912) c g
 Chironomus prior Butler, 1982 i c g
 Chironomus proximus (Meigen, 1830) c g
 Chironomus pruninosus (Kieffer, 1911) c g
 Chironomus prussicus (Kieffer, 1910) c g
 Chironomus pseudofasciatus Gerry, 1932 c g
 Chironomus pseudohirticollis (Strobl, 1880) c g
 Chironomus pseudomendax Wulker, 1999 c g
 Chironomus pseudothummi Strenzke, 1959 c g
 Chironomus pseudovulpes (Kruseman, 1933) c g
 Chironomus psilochirus (Kieffer, 1911) c g
 Chironomus pubicornis (Fabricius, 1805) c g
 Chironomus pubitarsis (Zetterstedt, 1850) c g
 Chironomus pulcher Wiedemann, 1830 c g
 Chironomus punctatus (Fabricius, 1805) c g
 Chironomus pungens (Townes, 1945) i c g
 Chironomus pusio (Meigen, 1830) c g
 Chironomus pygmaeus (Meigen, 1818) c g
 Chironomus quadratus Johannsen, 1932 c g
 Chironomus quadrifasciatus (Kieffer, 1917) c
 Chironomus quinnitukqut  g
 Chironomus radialis (Kieffer, 1911) c g
 Chironomus ramosus Chaudhuri, Das & Sublette, 1992 c g
 Chironomus rectilobus Kieffer, 1921 c g
 Chironomus redeuns Walker i g
 Chironomus reissi Correia, Trivinho-Strixino & Michailova, 2005 c g
 Chironomus reservatus Shobanov, 1997 c g
 Chironomus restrictus Kieffer, 1922 c g
 Chironomus rhacusensis (Strobl, 1900) c g
 Chironomus riihimakiensis Wulker, 1973 c g
 Chironomus rincon Sublette & Sasa, 1994 c g
 Chironomus riparius Meigen, 1804 i c g
 Chironomus rivularis (Meigen, 1838) c g
 Chironomus rostratus (Kieffer, 1911) c
 Chironomus rufescens (Kieffer, 1911) c g
 Chironomus ruficollis (Macquart, 1834) c g
 Chironomus rufovittatus (Staeger, 1839) c g
 Chironomus rupicola (Kieffer, 1915) c g
 Chironomus rusticus Meigen, 1835 c g
 Chironomus salinarius Kieffer, 1915 i c g
 Chironomus samoensis Edwards, 1928 i c g
 Chironomus sanctipaula Sublette, 1966 i c g
 Chironomus sanus (Weyenbergh, 1886) c g
 Chironomus satchelli Freeman, 1957 c g
 Chironomus sauteri Kieffer g
 Chironomus sauterianus Kieffer, 1921 c g
 Chironomus saxatilis Wulker, 1981 c g
 Chironomus saxonicus Lenz, 1921 c g
 Chironomus scotti Kieffer, 1911 c g
 Chironomus scriptus (Meigen, 1838) c g
 Chironomus seitenstettensis (Strobl, 1880) c g
 Chironomus sellatus (Meigen, 1830) c g
 Chironomus semiflavus (Kieffer, 1911) c g
 Chironomus seminiger (Kieffer, 1911) c g
 Chironomus sessilis (Kieffer, 1911) c
 Chironomus setivalva (Shilova, 1957) c g
 Chironomus setonis Tokunaga, 1936 c g
 Chironomus severus (Weyenbergh, 1886) c g
 Chironomus sexipunctatus Tokunaga, 1964 c g
 Chironomus sexpunctatus (Kieffer, 1911) c g
 Chironomus seydeli Goetghebuer, 1936 c g
 Chironomus sibericus (Kieffer, 1918) c g
 Chironomus sibiriae (Kieffer, 1918) c g
 Chironomus sieberti Kieffer, 1921 c g
 Chironomus signaticollis (Goetghebuer, 1921) c g
 Chironomus simantobeceus Sasa, Suzuki & Sakai, 1998 c g
 Chironomus sinensis (Kieffer, 1911) c g
 Chironomus sinicus Kiknadze, Wang, Istomina & Gunderina, 2005 c g
 Chironomus sinuosus Guha & Chaudhuri, 1984 c g
 Chironomus sociellus (Zetterstedt, 1838) c g
 Chironomus socius (Walker, 1848) c g
 Chironomus sokolovae Istomina, Siirin, Polukonova & Kiknadze, 2000 c g
 Chironomus solicitus Hirvenoja, 1962 c g
 Chironomus solitus Linevich, 1971 c g
 Chironomus sordidatus Kieffer, 1913 c g
 Chironomus sordidus (Kieffer, 1912) c g
 Chironomus sororius Wulker, 1973 c g
 Chironomus speciosus (Kieffer, 1911) c
 Chironomus spilopterus (Williston, 1896) c g
 Chironomus staegeri Lundbeck, 1898 i c g b
 Chironomus stictogaster (Kieffer, 1911) c g
 Chironomus stigmaterus Say, 1823 i c g
 Chironomus storai Goetghebuer, 1937 g
 Chironomus strenzkei Fittkau, 1968 c g
 Chironomus striatipennis (Kieffer, 1910) c g
 Chironomus striatus Strenzke, 1959 c g
 Chironomus stricticornis (Kieffer, 1911) c g
 Chironomus stylifera Johannsen i g
 Chironomus subantarcticus Sublette & Wirth, 1980 c g
 Chironomus subdolus Skuse, 1889 c g
 Chironomus subrectus Kieffer, 1922 c g
 Chironomus subreductus Zavrel, 1932 c g
 Chironomus subtendens Townes i g
 Chironomus subviridis Kieffer, 1918 c g
 Chironomus sulfurosus Yamamoto, 1990 c g
 Chironomus sulphuricollis (Meigen, 1830) c g
 Chironomus sumptuosus (Kieffer, 1912) c g
 Chironomus superbus (Kieffer, 1912) c g
 Chironomus suwai Golybina, Martin, Kiknadze, Siirin, Ivanchenko &  Makarchenko, 2003 c g
 Chironomus suzukii (Matsurmura, 1916) c g
 Chironomus sydneyensis (Kieffer, 1917) c g
 Chironomus tamapullus (Sasa, 1981) i c g
 Chironomus tardus Butler, 1982 i c g
 Chironomus tenerrimus (Kieffer, 1911) c g
 Chironomus tentans Fabricius, 1805 i c g
 Chironomus tenuicaudatus Goetghebuer, 1950 c g
 Chironomus tenuis (Macquart, 1826) c g
 Chironomus tenuistylus Brundin, 1949 c g
 Chironomus tenuitarsis (Kieffer, 1910) c g
 Chironomus tenuiventris Kieffer, 1917 c g
 Chironomus tepperi Skuse, 1889 c g
 Chironomus terminalis (Meigen, 1818) c g
 Chironomus tessellatus (Blanchard, 1852) c g
 Chironomus tetraleucus Kieffer, 1914 c g
 Chironomus thoracicus (Wiedemann, 1818) c g
 Chironomus tokarabeceus Sasa & Suzuki, 1995 c g
 Chironomus tokyoensis (Sasaki, 1928) c g
 Chironomus trabicola Shobanov, Wulker & Kiknadze, 2002 c g
 Chironomus transvaalensis Kieffer, 1923 c g
 Chironomus trichomerus Walker, 1848 i c g
 Chironomus tricolor (Wulp, 1874) c g
 Chironomus trifasciatus Tokunaga, 1964 c g
 Chironomus trifilis Kieffer, 1915 c g
 Chironomus trilobatus Rempel, 1939 c g
 Chironomus trimaculatus Macquart, 1838 c g
 Chironomus trinigrivittatus Tokunaga, 1940 c g
 Chironomus triornatus Weyenbergh, 1886 c g
 Chironomus triseta Thienemann & Kieffer, 1916 c g
 Chironomus tropicalis (Kieffer, 1913) c
 Chironomus tuberculatus (Townes, 1945) i c g b
 Chironomus turfaceus Kieffer, 1929 c g
 Chironomus tusimaabeus Sasa & Suzuki, 1999 c g
 Chironomus tutulifer (Weyenbergh, 1886) c g
 Chironomus tuvanicus Kiknadze, Siirin & Wulker, 1993 c g
 Chironomus tuxis Curran, 1930 i c g
 Chironomus uliginosus Keyl, 1960 c g
 Chironomus usenicus Loginova & Belyanina, 1994 c g
 Chironomus utahensis Malloch, 1915 i c g
 Chironomus uttarpadeshensis Singh & Kulshrestha, 1976 c g
 Chironomus validus (Kieffer, 1912) c g
 Chironomus valkanovi Michailova, 1974 c g
 Chironomus vallenduuki Ashe & O'Connor, 2015 g
 Chironomus vancouveri Michailova & Fischer, 1986 c g
 Chironomus variicornis (Kieffer, 1912) c g
 Chironomus variotarsatus (Becker, 1903) c g
 Chironomus venosus (Meigen, 1830) c g
 Chironomus ventralis (Kieffer, 1918) c g
 Chironomus venustus Staeger, 1839 c g
 Chironomus vernus (Miegen, 1818) c g
 Chironomus vicarius (Walker, 1850) c g
 Chironomus villis (Kieffer, 1911) c g
 Chironomus virens (Linnaeus, 1767) c g
 Chironomus viridellus Kieffer, 1918 c g
 Chironomus viridianus (Macquart, 1834) c g
 Chironomus viridipes Macquart, 1826 c g
 Chironomus viridis (Zetterstedt, 1838) c g
 Chironomus viridiventris (Kieffer, 1911) c
 Chironomus viridulus Linnaeus i g
 Chironomus vittiventris Edwards, 1931 c g
 Chironomus vockerothi Rasmussen, 1984 i c g
 Chironomus vulpes Kieffer, 1924 c g
 Chironomus whitseli Sublette & Sublette, 1974 i c g b
 Chironomus willistoni Johannsen, 1905 c g
 Chironomus winnelli Wulker, 2007 c g
 Chironomus winthemi Goetghebuer, 1931 c g
 Chironomus wuelkeri Sublette & Sasa, 1994 c g
 Chironomus wulkeri Philinkova & Belyanina, 1993 c g
 Chironomus xanthus Rempel, 1939 c g
 Chironomus yoshimatsui Martin and Sublette, 1972 i c g
 Chironomus zavreli Kieffer, 1922 c g
 Chironomus zealandicus Hudson, 1892 c g

Data sources: i = ITIS, c = Catalogue of Life, g = GBIF, b = Bugguide.net

References

Chironomus